Dalga Arena is a multi-use stadium in Mardakan settlement of Baku, Azerbaijan.  It is currently used mostly for football matches.  The stadium holds 6,500 people and opened by Sepp Blatter and Michel Platini on 6 June 2011.

The stadium was one of venues during 2012 FIFA U-17 Women's World Cup.

Dalga Arena already hosted two matches of the Azerbaijan national team against Macedonia in a friendly and Austria in the UEFA Euro 2012 qualifying.

See also
List of football stadiums in Azerbaijan

References

External links

Football venues in Baku
Multi-purpose stadiums in Azerbaijan
Sports venues completed in 2011